American rapper Gucci Mane has released fourteen studio albums, two collaborative albums, six compilation albums, one soundtrack, seven extended plays (EPs), 74 mixtapes and 100 singles (including 52 as a featured artist) and 10 promotional singles.

His first four albums were released by Big Cat Records, under the aegis of Tommy Boy Records, while his subsequent major projects were released by Atlantic Records.

Albums

Studio albums

Compilation albums

Collaborative albums

Soundtracks

Mixtapes

Extended plays

Singles

As lead artist

As featured artist

Promotional singles

Other charted songs

Guest appearances

Music videos

As lead artist

Notes

References

External links 
 Official website
 
 
 

Discographies of American artists
Hip hop discographies
Gucci Mane albums
Gucci Mane songs